
King Khalid Royal Reserve, formerly as al-Thumamah Wildlife Park and better known as al-Thumamah Park, is a nature reserve and a popular outdoor tourist attraction in the al-Thumamah region of northeastern Riyadh, Saudi Arabia. It was a private farm owned by King Khalid and was partially turned into a public park after its nationalization by the Saudi government under King Fahd in 1983 following the former's death in 1982. It was renamed as the King Khalid Royal Reserve in October 2019 after its recognition as a protected area through a royal decree by King Salman.

History 
Prior to its nationalization by the Saudi government in 1983, the park was a private farm owned by the late King Khalid. Following his death in 1982, the newly crowned monarch of Saudi Arabia, King Fahd issued a royal decree for nationalization of the property. The then governor of Riyadh Prince Salman tasked the High Commission for the Development of Arriyadh to transform the farm into a public park. Around 1992, both the Al Thumamah Wildlife Park and the Thumamah National Park projects were merged under the responsibility of High Commission for the Development of Arriyadh. In October 2019, King Salman issued a royal decree which officially declared the area as a natural reserve and was renamed as the King Khalid Royal Reserve.

See also
 Geography of Saudi Arabia
 Red Sand (Riyadh)
 Thumamah Airport

References

External links
 Red Sand Dune – Riyadh, Saudi Arabia on YouTube

Deserts of Saudi Arabia
Parks in Saudi Arabia
Riyadh Province